Line 10 of Suzhou Rail Transit (Chinese: 苏州轨道交通10号线) is a under construction north–south regional rapid transit line in Suzhou, Jiangsu, China.  The Northern section of Line 10 is 90.34 km in length with 21 stations, including 13 elevated stations and 8 underground stations. The line was formerly known as Suzhou Rail Transit Line S5.

Later sections of the line under planning will continue south through the city center of Suzhou to Wujiang District, Suzhou creating a north-south express regional rapid transit line.

The line is designed for trains to operate up to 160 km/h and have passing loop for Direct Express and Express services to operate.

History
Construction of the Northern section, known as the Suyuzhang section, started on January 2, 2023. It is expected to open in 2028. The length of this section is 90.34 kilometers.

It runs through Zhangjiagang North Railway Station, Zhangjiagang Coach Station, Zhangjiagang Railway Station, Tangqiao, Fenghuang, Shanghu, to urban Suzhou at Suzhou North Railway Station and connects the Suzhou city to county-level cities of Zhangjiagang and Changshu, which are under administartion of Suzhou.

References

Suzhou Rail Transit lines